Hun-Came is one of the "Brass Knuckles", a series of equatorial dark regions on Pluto. It is named after Jun Kameh  "One Death", one of the Quiché death gods in the Popol Vuh.

References

Regions of Pluto